Madhubani is a village in West Champaran district in the Indian state of Bihar.

Demographics
As of 2011 India census, Madhubani had a population of 2266 in 438 households. Males constitute 52.38% of the population and females 47.61%. Madhubani has an average literacy rate of 41.39%, lower than the national average of 74%: male literacy is 67.59%, and female literacy is 32.4%. In Madhubani, 18.4% of the population is under 6 years of age.

References

Villages in West Champaran district